Following is a list of trial films, containing films which center on the legal process of a trial, usually a trial by jury.

Lists of films by genre
Courtroom films